The Bisbee Miners were a season-season independent professional baseball team that played in the Arizona Summer League representing Bisbee, Arizona.  They play their home games at Desert Sun Stadium in Yuma, Arizona, home of the North American League's Yuma Scorpions.  They were one of two teams that replaced the 2009 league champion Canada Miners for the 2010 season.  The team folded in 2011 as they were returned to their former Golden Baseball League identity of the Mesa Miners.

Arizona Summer League (2010):

References

External links
 Arizona Summer League official website
 North American Baseball League official website

Professional baseball teams in Arizona
Defunct baseball teams in Arizona
Baseball teams disestablished in 2011
Baseball teams established in 2010